Phú Xuyên station (Vietnamese: Ga Phú Xuyên) is a railway station on the North–South railway and is located in Phú Xuyên, Hanoi.

References 

Railway stations in Hanoi